Herman Jerome Thompson (March 25, 1923 – December 23, 2010) was an American football and baseball player and coach. He served as the head football coach at Upsala College in East Orange, New Jersey in 1947, Augustana University in Sioux Falls, South Dakota from 1948 to 1950, and Ripon College in Ripon, Wisconsin from 1956 to 1957. Thompson was also the head baseball coach at Augustana from 1950 to 1951.

Thompson played college football at St. Olaf College and the University of Wisconsin. He also lettered in baseball and track at Wisconsin in 1945. After graduating from Wisconsin in 1946, Thompson began his coaching career that fall as the football coach at Manistique High School in Manistique, Michigan.

Thompson was also a professor of physical education as Augustana. He resigned from his position  has Augustana in 1951 to become head football and head track coach at Neenah High School in Neenah, Wisconsin. He led his football teams at Neenah to a record of 30–6–3 in five seasons.

Head coaching record

College football

References

1923 births
2010 deaths
American football fullbacks
American football halfbacks
Augustana (South Dakota) Vikings baseball coaches
Augustana (South Dakota) Vikings football coaches
Ripon Red Hawks football coaches
St. Olaf Oles football players
Upsala Vikings football coaches
Wisconsin Badgers baseball players
Wisconsin Badgers football players
Wisconsin Badgers men's track and field athletes
High school football coaches in Michigan
High school football coaches in Wisconsin
High school track and field coaches in the United States
People from Baldwin, Wisconsin
Coaches of American football from Wisconsin
Players of American football from Wisconsin
Baseball players from Wisconsin
Track and field athletes from Wisconsin